The Ministry of Foreign Affairs of the Russian Empire was a ministry of the Russian Empire responsible for relations with foreign states from 1802 to 1917.

The Ministry of Foreign Affairs was established by decree of the Emperor Alexander I of Russia on 8 September 1802 by Manifesto "On the establishment of ministries." With the formation of the Ministry of Foreign Affairs, the preceding Collegium of Foreign Affairs was not disbanded and continued to exist until April 1832 as a child agency of the Ministry. According to the decree "On the formation of the Ministry of Foreign Affairs" from 1832, the Ministry included the Council, the Asian Department, the Department of External Relations, the Department of Internal Affairs and the Department of Economic and Accounting Affairs, as well as three main archives: two in Saint Petersburg and one in Moscow. 

The Ministry of Foreign Affairs became one of the ministries of the Council of Ministers from 1905 until it was dissolved on 2 March 1917 after the February Revolution, though remnants served as the foreign ministry of the short-lived Russian Provisional Government until October. Its role was eventually replaced by the People's Commissariat for Foreign Affairs of the Soviet Union in 1923.

Ministers

Provisional Government/Russian Republic

See also 
Minister of Foreign Affairs (Russia)#Russian Empire

References

Government of the Russian Empire
Russian Empire